Orit Malka Strook (born 15 March 1960) is an Israeli far-right politician. She serves as the Minister of National Missions in the thirty-seventh government,  and is a member of the Knesset for the Religious Zionist Party, and served as member of the Knesset for Tkuma (a faction within the Jewish Home) between 2013 and 2015. Strook is also among the leaders of the Jewish settlement in Hebron, and she established the Israeli non-governmental organization Human Rights Organization of Judea and Samaria, which she headed between 2004 and 2012.

Biography
Orit Cohen (later Strook) was born to a family of lawyers from Jerusalem. Her middle name Malka was given to her in memory of her grandmother, the Hungarian Jewish poet Mária Kecskeméti. Growing up, Strook studied at the Hebrew University Secondary School. In the late 1970s, while she was in the 11th grade, Strook gradually became more religious, and eventually became a Baalat Teshuvah, embracing Orthodox Judaism. During that period, she began studying at the religious Zionist outreach organization and yeshiva Meir Institute. Shortly thereafter, she married Avraham Strook, a student of Rabbi Haim Drukman. The young couple briefly lived in the Israeli settlement of Yamit in the Sinai Peninsula, but after Sinai was handed over to Egypt in 1982 as part of the terms of the 1979 Egypt–Israel peace treaty, and Yamit was evacuated, Strook and her family joined the Jewish settler community in Hebron.

In 2007, Strook's son Zvi was convicted of abusing a Palestinian boy and killing a young goat, and as a result was sentenced to 30 months in prison. In response to the ruling, Strook stated that, "Unlike the Court, who preferred to believe the Arab witnesses, we are sure of Zvi's innocence, and are hurting from the success of his haters and would assist him to deal with the difficult sentence imposed on him".

As of 2013, Strook is a resident of Avraham Avinu (Hebron), an Israeli settlement in the West Bank. She has 11 children and 12 grandchildren.

Civic career
After the Cave of the Patriarchs was closed for Jewish prayer following the Cave of the Patriarchs massacre in 1994, Strook was elected as the head of the "Women's Committee for the Cave" (ועד נשים למען המערה), and worked to convince the political system to re-open the cave for Jewish visitors. Since 2000, she has headed the legal-political department of the organization of Jewish settlers in Hebron. In 2002, Strook founded the Human Rights Organization of Judea and Samaria, following the Israeli evacuation of Israeli settlers Livnat Ozeri and her five children from Hill 26 near Kiryat Arba.

Political career
Strook was placed thirteenth on the joint National Union–National Religious Party list for the 2006 elections, but failed to win a seat as the alliance won only nine seats.

In the 2013 elections, Strook was elected to the Knesset on The Jewish Home list. She was among the Knesset's most vehement opponents to recognition of non-Orthodox movements of Judaism. She was placed thirteenth on the party's list for the 2015 elections, losing her seat as the party was reduced to eight seats.

For the 2021 elections, Strook was placed fifth on Religious Zionist Party's list and returned to the Knesset, as the alliance won six seats.
In December 2022, Strook suggested that doctors could refuse to treat gay people if it conflicted with their religious beliefs.

References

External links

1960 births
Living people
21st-century Israeli women politicians
Israeli Orthodox Jews
Israeli people of Hungarian-Jewish descent
Israeli settlers
Jewish Israeli politicians
Members of the 19th Knesset (2013–2015)
Members of the 24th Knesset (2021–2022)
Members of the 25th Knesset (2022–)
Politicians from Jerusalem
Religious Zionist Party politicians
The Jewish Home politicians
Women members of the Knesset